Contepomi is a surname. Notable people with the surname include:

Felipe Contepomi (born 1977), Argentine rugby union player and coach
Manuel Contepomi (born 1977), Argentine rugby union player, twin brother of Felipe